Metaescaline (3,4-dimethoxy-5-ethoxyphenethylamine) is a lesser-known psychedelic drug.  It is an analog of mescaline. Metaescaline was first synthesized by Alexander Shulgin. In his book PiHKAL, the dosage range is listed as 200–350 mg, and the duration listed as 8–12 hours. Metaescaline produces mental insights, entactogenic, MDMA-like effects, and TOMSO-like activation. Little data exists about the pharmacological properties, metabolism, and toxicity of metaescaline, though it has been studied to a limited extent in comparison with other related compounds.

See also 
 Substituted phenethylamine
 Phenethylamine
 Psychedelics, dissociatives and deliriants

References 

Psychedelic phenethylamines
Mescalines